Samir Sellami (born July 13, 1977) is a former Tunisian male volleyball player. He was part of the Tunisia men's national volleyball team. He competed with the national team at the 2004 Summer Olympics in Athens, Greece. He played with CS Sfaxien in 2004.

Clubs
  CS Sfaxien (2004)

See also
 Tunisia at the 2004 Summer Olympics

References

1977 births
Living people
Tunisian men's volleyball players
Place of birth missing (living people)
Volleyball players at the 2004 Summer Olympics
Olympic volleyball players of Tunisia
Mediterranean Games silver medalists for Tunisia
Mediterranean Games medalists in volleyball
Competitors at the 2013 Mediterranean Games